Miss Earth Poland is a title given to a Polish woman who represents Poland at Miss Earth, which is an annual international beauty pageant promoting environmental awareness. The current franchise holder for Miss Earth in Poland is Miss Polonia, who was also the franchise owner for 13 years since 2002.

Poland has been one of the top performing countries in Miss Earth. As of its fourteenth year, Poland was able to produce eight placements including a Miss Fire (3rd Runner-up) in (2003) and a Miss Water (2nd Runner-up) in (2005).

History

2002-2014: Miss Polonia
Miss Polonia is a pageant responsible for sending delegates to Miss Universe and Miss International pageants. The Miss Earth Poland title was given to a runner up or an appointed contestant. However, from 2003-2007, Miss Polonia sent its main winner from the previous year with the exception in 2006 where they appointed the third runner up.

The last delegate for Miss Earth from Miss Polonia is Patrycja Dorywalska who is one of the top five finalists at Miss Polonia 2012.

2015-2017: Showbiz and Miss Egzotica
Miss Egzotica is an annual pageant for Polish women who have a multiracial roots. The pageant supports diversity to raise awareness in Poland. The pageant was awarded a European Medal by the BCC, European Economic and Social Committee in Brussels and the Ministry of Foreign Affairs.

2018-2021: Miss Earth Poland
In 2018, the Miss Earth Organization authorized Francys Barraza-Sudnicka (Miss Universe Poland 2006 and Miss Earth Poland 2006) as the new national director and organizer of newly established Miss Earth Poland pageant. However in 2021, Miss Earth Poland was not able to send a representative for Miss Earth 2021 pageant.

2022-present: Return to Miss Polonia
Carousel Productions gave the rights once again to Miss Polonia in sending a Polish delegate to Miss Earth beginning 2022. Miss Polonia appointed Julia Baryga from Łódź to compete for the 22nd edition of Miss Earth. Julia Baryga is the Miss Polonia 2022 2nd Runner-up.

Titleholders

Representatives to Miss Earth
This list includes all Polish representatives from 2002 up to the present who have gone to compete at Miss Earth.
Color key

See also
 Miss Polonia
 Miss Polski
Miss World Poland

References

External links
 Miss Earth Poland Official Facebook

Poland
Beauty pageants in Poland
Polish awards
2002 establishments in Poland